Barbara Charline Jordan (February 21, 1936 – January 17, 1996) was an African American lawyer, educator, and politician. A Democrat, she was the first African American elected to the Texas Senate after Reconstruction and the first Southern African-American woman elected to the United States House of Representatives. Jordan is known for her eloquent opening statement at the House Judiciary Committee hearings during the impeachment process against Richard Nixon. In 1976, she became the first African-American, and the first woman, to ever deliver a keynote address at a Democratic National Convention. She received the Presidential Medal of Freedom, among numerous other honors.  She was the first African-American woman to be buried in the Texas State Cemetery. Jordan is also known for her work as chair of the U.S. Commission on Immigration Reform.

Early life 
Barbara Charline Jordan was born in Houston, Texas's Fifth Ward. Jordan's childhood was centered  on church life. Her mother was Arlyne Patten Jordan, a teacher in the church, and her father was Benjamin Jordan, a Baptist preacher. Through her mother, Jordan was the great-granddaughter of Edward Patton, who was one of the last African American members of the Texas House of Representatives prior to disenfranchisement of Black Texans under Jim Crow. Barbara Jordan was the youngest of three children, with siblings Rose Mary Jordan McGowan and Bennie Jordan Creswell (1933–2000). Jordan attended Roberson Elementary School. She graduated from Phillis Wheatley High School in 1952 with honors.

Jordan credited a speech she heard in her high school years by Edith S. Sampson with inspiring her to become an attorney.  Because of segregation, she could not attend The University of Texas at Austin and instead chose Texas Southern University, an historically black institution, majoring in political science and history. At Texas Southern University, Jordan was a national champion debater, defeating opponents from Yale and Brown, and tying Harvard University. She graduated magna cum laude in 1956. At Texas Southern University, she pledged Delta Gamma chapter of Delta Sigma Theta sorority. She attended Boston University School of Law, graduating in 1959.

Jordan taught political science at Tuskegee Institute in Alabama for a year. In 1960, she returned to Houston and started a private law practice.

Political career 
Jordan campaigned unsuccessfully in 1962 and 1964 for the Texas House of Representatives. She won a seat in the Texas Senate in 1966, becoming the first African-American state senator in Texas since 1883 and the first black woman to serve in that body. Re-elected to a full term in the Texas Senate in 1968, she served until 1972. She was the first African-American woman to serve as president pro tempore of the state senate and served one day, June 10, 1972, as acting governor of Texas. Jordan was the first African-American woman to serve as governor of a state. During her time in the Texas Legislature, Jordan sponsored or cosponsored some 70 bills.

In 1972, she was elected to the U.S. House of Representatives, the first woman elected in her own right to represent Texas in the House. She received extensive support from former President Lyndon B. Johnson, who helped her secure a position on the House Judiciary Committee. In 1974, she made an influential televised speech before the House Judiciary Committee supporting the impeachment of President Richard Nixon, Johnson's successor as president. In 1975, she was appointed by Carl Albert, then Speaker of the United States House of Representatives, to the Democratic Steering and Policy Committee.

In 1976, Jordan, mentioned as a possible running mate to Jimmy Carter of Georgia, became instead the first African-American woman to deliver a keynote address at the Democratic National Convention. Despite not being a candidate, Jordan received one delegate vote (0.03%) for president at the Convention.

In November 1977, Barbara Jordan spoke at the 1977 National Women's Conference.  Other speakers included Rosalynn Carter, Betty Ford, Lady Bird Johnson, Bella Abzug, Audrey Colom, Claire Randall, Gerridee Wheeler, Cecilia Burciaga, Gloria Steinem, Lenore Hershey and Jean O'Leary.

Jordan retired from politics in 1979 and became an adjunct professor teaching ethics at the University of Texas at Austin Lyndon B. Johnson School of Public Affairs. She was again a keynote speaker at the Democratic National Convention in 1992.

In 1994, Clinton awarded her the Presidential Medal of Freedom and the NAACP presented her with the Spingarn Medal. She was honored many times and was given over 20 honorary degrees from institutions across the country, including Harvard and Princeton, and was elected to the Texas and National Women's Halls of Fame.

Statement on the Articles of Impeachment 

On July 25, 1974, Jordan delivered a 15-minute televised speech in front of the members of the U.S. House Judiciary Committee.  She presented an opening speech during the hearings that were part of the impeachment process against Richard Nixon. This speech is thought to be one of the greatest speeches of 20th-century American history. Throughout her speech, Jordan strongly stood by the Constitution of the United States. She defended the checks and balances system, which was set in place to inhibit any politician from abusing their power. Jordan never flat out said that she wanted Nixon impeached, but rather subtly and cleverly implied her thoughts. She simply stated facts that proved Nixon to be untrustworthy and heavily involved in illegal situations, and quoted the drafters of the Constitution to argue that actions like Nixon's during the scandal corresponded with their understanding of impeachable offenses. She protested that the Watergate scandal will forever ruin the trust American citizens have for their government. This powerful and influential statement earned Jordan national praise for her rhetoric, morals, and wisdom.

Legislation 
Jordan supported the Community Reinvestment Act of 1977, legislation that required banks to lend and make services available to underserved poor and minority communities. She supported the renewal of the Voting Rights Act of 1965 and expansion of that act to cover language minorities; this extended protection to Hispanics in Texas and was opposed by Texas Governor Dolph Briscoe and Secretary of State Mark White. She also authored an act that ended federal authorization of price fixing by manufacturers. Jordan was also a proponent of the Equal Rights Amendment and issued a statement in support of extending the deadline in 1979. During Jordan's tenure as a Congresswoman, she sponsored or cosponsored over 300 bills or resolutions, several of which are still in effect today as law.

U.S. Commission on Immigration Reform 
From 1994 until her death, Jordan chaired the U.S. Commission on Immigration Reform. The commission recommended that total immigration be cut by one-third to approximately 550,000 per year. The commission supported increasing enforcement against undocumented migrants and their employers, eliminating visa preferences for siblings and adult children of U.S. citizens, and ending unskilled immigration except for refugees and nuclear families. The commission's report to Congress said that it was "a right and responsibility of a democratic society to manage immigration so that it serves the national interest", concluded that "legal immigration has strengthened and can continue to strengthen this country" and "decrie[d] hostility and discrimination against immigrants as antithetical to the traditions and interests of the country." The commission recommended that the United States reduce the number of refugees admitted annually to a floor of 50,000 (this level would be lifted during emergencies).

The recommendations made by the U.S. Commission on Immigration Reform under Jordan's leadership are frequently cited by American immigration restrictionists.

Personal life 
The U.S. National Archives described Barbara Jordan as the first LGBTQ+ woman in Congress. Jordan's partner of approximately twenty years was Nancy Earl, an educational psychologist who met Jordan on a camping trip in the late 1960s. Earl was an occasional speechwriter for Jordan, and later cared for her when she developed multiple sclerosis in 1973. While the Houston Chronicle obituary of Jordan identified Earl as her "longtime companion", and while other sources have stated that Earl was Jordan's same-sex partner, neither woman is known to have publicly stated that the two had a romantic relationship.

In the KUT-FM radio documentary Rediscovering Barbara Jordan, President Bill Clinton said that he had wanted to nominate Jordan for the United States Supreme Court, but by the time he could do so, Jordan's health problems prevented him from nominating her. 

On July 31, 1988, Jordan nearly drowned in her backyard swimming pool while doing physical therapy, but she was saved by Earl, who found her floating in the pool and revived her.

Death and burial 
Jordan died at the age of 59 of complications from pneumonia on January 17, 1996, in Austin, Texas. She 
also had leukemia.

She was interred in Texas State Cemetery. She was the first African American to receive this honor, and previously advocated African Americans to be buried in the state cemetery when she served in the Texas State Senate. Jordan's grave rests near that of the "Father of Texas" Stephen F. Austin.

Recognition and legacy 
 1984: Inducted into the Texas Women's Hall of Fame
 1990: Inducted into the National Women's Hall of Fame
 1992: The Spingarn Medal from the NAACP
 1993: The Elizabeth Blackwell Award from Hobart and William Smith Colleges
 1994: The Presidential Medal of Freedom
 1995: The second ever female awardee of the United States Military Academy's Sylvanus Thayer Award

Jordan's 1974 statement on the articles of impeachment (regarding President Richard Nixon) was listed as #13 in American Rhetoric's Top 100 Speeches of the 20th Century (listed by rank).

Jordan's 1976 Democratic National Convention keynote address, the first major convention keynote speech ever by a woman and the first by an African American, was listed as #5 in American Rhetoric's Top 100 Speeches of the 20th Century (listed by rank).

Jordan was a member of the Peabody Awards Board of Jurors from 1978 to 1980.

Texas 
The main terminal at Austin-Bergstrom International Airport is named after Jordan. The airport also features a statue of Jordan by artist Bruce Wolfe.

A boulevard in central Austin is named after Jordan. Several schools bear her name, including elementary schools in Dallas, Texas, Odessa, Texas, and Austin, Texas, Barbara Jordan Early College Prep School, an elementary school in Richmond, Texas, Barbara C. Jordan Intermediate School, a middle school in Cibolo, Texas, Barbara Jordan High School in Houston, and The Barbara Jordan Institute for Policy Research at her undergraduate alma mater Texas Southern University. There is also a park named after Jordan in Needville, Texas (The Barbara Jordan Park).

The Kaiser Family Foundation operates the Barbara Jordan Health Policy Scholars, a fellowship designed for people of color who are college juniors, seniors, and recent graduates as a summer experience working in a congressional office.

Missouri 
An elementary school in University City School District is named after her, Barbara C. Jordan Elementary in University City, Missouri.

Other honors 
In 2000, the Jordan/Rustin Coalition (JRC) was created, honoring Jordan and Bayard Rustin, a leader in the civil rights movement and close confidante of Martin Luther King Jr. The organization mobilized gay and lesbian African Americans to aid in the passage of marriage equality in the state of California. According to its website, "the mission [of the JRC] is to empower Black same-gender loving, lesbian, gay, bisexual and transgender individuals and families in Greater Los Angeles, to promote equal marriage rights and to advocate for fair treatment of everyone without regard to race, sexual orientation, gender identity, or gender expression."

On March 27, 2000, a play based on Jordan's life premiered at the Victory Garden Theater in Chicago, Illinois.  Titled, Voice of Good Hope, Kristine Thatcher's biographical evocation of Jordan's life played in theaters from San Francisco to New York.

On April 24, 2009, a statue of Barbara Jordan was unveiled at the University of Texas at Austin, where Jordan taught at the time of her death. The Barbara Jordan statue campaign was paid for by a student fee increase approved by the University of Texas Board of Regents. The effort was originally spearheaded by the 2002–2003 Tappee class of the Texas Orange Jackets, the "oldest women's organization at the University" (of Texas at Austin).

In 2011, the Barbara Jordan Forever Stamp was issued. It is the 34th stamp in the Black Heritage series of U.S. stamps.

In 2012, Jordan was inducted into the Legacy Walk, an outdoor public display which celebrates LGBT history and people.
	
The Barbara Jordan Media Awards are given annually to media professionals and students who "have produced material for the public which accurately and positively reports on individuals with disabilities, using People First language and respectful depictions".

The Barbara Jordan Public-Private Leadership Award is presented by Texas Southern University's School of Public Affairs and School of Law. Its first recipient was former U.S. Secretary of State Hillary Clinton, on June 4, 2015.

The former sorting facility in downtown Houston was renamed the Barbara Jordan Post Office.

In the years following Jordan's passing, more African Americans would receive the honor of being buried in the Texas State Cemetery as well, including musical artists James Henry Cotton and Barbara Smith Conrad.

See also 
 History of the African-Americans in Houston
 List of African-American United States representatives
 List of first women lawyers and judges in Texas
 Texas African American History Memorial, Texas State Capitol
 Women in the United States House of Representatives

References

Further reading 
Rogers, Mary Beth. 1998. Barbara Jordan: American hero.

External links 

 
 Jordan's Statement on the Articles of Impeachment During the Nixon Impeachment Hearings in Text and Audio from AmericanRhetoric.com
 Jordan's 1976 Democratic National Convention Keynote Address in Text and Audio from AmericanRhetoric.com
 Jordan's 1992 Democratic National Convention Address Transcript from AmericanRhetoric.com
 Barbara Jordan, Governor of Texas for a day, program of ceremonies, June 10, 1972, hosted by the Portal to Texas History
 Interview with Max Sherman, editor of Barbara Jordan – Speaking the Truth with Eloquent Thunder on kaisernetwork.org
 Oral History Interviews with Barbara Jordan, from the Lyndon Baines Johnson Library
 The Texas Experience – Barbara Jordan Presents Lyndon Baines Johnson , from the Texas Archive of the Moving Image
 Special Collections, Texas Southern University
 This American Life: Before Things Went to Hell, Act One, January 13, 2019

 

|-

|-

|-

1936 births
1996 deaths
20th-century American lawyers
20th-century American politicians
20th-century American women politicians
Activists from Texas
African-American Christians
African-American members of the United States House of Representatives
African-American state legislators in Texas
African-American candidates for President of the United States
African-American women in politics
Baptists from Texas
Boston University School of Law alumni
Burials at Texas State Cemetery
Deaths from pneumonia in Texas
Delta Sigma Theta members
Democratic Party members of the United States House of Representatives from Texas
Female members of the United States House of Representatives
Female candidates for President of the United States
LGBT African Americans
LGBT members of the United States Congress
People from Houston
People with multiple sclerosis
Presidential Medal of Freedom recipients
Spingarn Medal winners
Texas Southern University alumni
Democratic Party Texas state senators
Candidates in the 1976 United States presidential election
Women state legislators in Texas
20th-century American women lawyers
20th-century Baptists
20th-century African-American women
20th-century African-American politicians
20th-century American LGBT people
LGBT people from Texas
Equal Rights Amendment activists